Philip Gregory Wheeler (born December 12, 1984) is a former American football linebacker. He was drafted by the Indianapolis Colts in the third round of the 2008 NFL Draft. He played college football at Georgia Tech.

Wheeler has also played for the Oakland Raiders, Miami Dolphins, San Francisco 49ers, and Atlanta Falcons.

Early years
In 2000, Wheeler, a sophomore, helped lead the Shaw High School football team to win the Georgia High School Association's AAAA Football State Championship. As a senior, he was named as an Honorable Mention All-Region selection by PrepStar and the Atlanta Journal-Constitution named him as a first team Class AAAA All-State selection.

College career
In the 2005 season, Wheeler recorded 65 total tackles, 11.5 tackles-for-loss, 4.5 sacks, four interceptions, eight passes defended, and one forced fumble. In the 2006 season, he recorded 89 total tackles, 14.5 tackles-for-loss, nine sacks, five passes defended, one forced fumble, and one fumble recovery. In the 2007 season, he recorded 89 total tackles, nine tackles-for-loss, six sacks, five passes defended, one forced fumble, and one fumble recovery.

Professional career

Indianapolis Colts
Wheeler was drafted by the Indianapolis Colts in the third round (93rd pick) of the 2008 NFL Draft. He played for the Colts from 2008 to 2011.

Oakland Raiders
Wheeler signed a one-year contract with the Oakland Raiders on March 30, 2012. He had a career year totaling 109 tackles, three sacks, and two forced fumbles.

Miami Dolphins
Wheeler signed with the Miami Dolphins on March 12, 2013 to a 5-year, $25 million deal with $13 million guaranteed. Wheeler was brought in to replace Kevin Burnett. Wheeler was released by the Dolphins on March 10, 2015.

San Francisco 49ers
Wheeler was signed by the San Francisco 49ers on April 30, 2015. He was released by the 49ers on September 4.

Atlanta Falcons
Wheeler signed with the Atlanta Falcons on October 20, 2015.

In the 2016 season, Wheeler and the Falcons reached Super Bowl LI, where they faced the New England Patriots on February 5, 2017. In the Super Bowl, he had one total tackle as the Falcons fell in a 34–28 overtime defeat.

Arizona Cardinals
On July 27, 2017, Wheeler signed with the Arizona Cardinals. He was released on September 8, 2017, but was re-signed a few days later. He was released again on September 15, 2017 but re-signed a few days later, only to be released again on September 25.

References

External links

Atlanta Falcons bio
Georgia Tech Yellow Jackets bio

1984 births
Living people
Players of American football from Columbus, Georgia
American football linebackers
Georgia Tech Yellow Jackets football players
Indianapolis Colts players
Oakland Raiders players
Miami Dolphins players
San Francisco 49ers players
Atlanta Falcons players
Arizona Cardinals players